The short-legged ground roller (Brachypteracias leptosomus) is a species of bird in the ground roller family Brachypteraciidae. It is the only living species in the genus Brachypteracias and is endemic to Madagascar. It is threatened by habitat loss.

Taxonomy and systematics
The short-legged ground roller is the only extant species in the genus  Brachypteracias, although a fossil species, Brachypteracias langrandi, has been described. The short-legged ground roller is more arboreal than other ground rollers, and may represent the ancestral form of the family. The genus Brachypteracias once included the scaly ground roller, but a 2001 study of the DNA of the family found that the two are not closely related. The same study found that the short-legged ground roller is basal in the family.

The genus  name is derived from the Ancient Greek brakhupteros for short-winged. The species name leptosomus is also Greek and derived from leptos for delicate and sōma for body.

Distribution and habitat
The short-legged ground roller is endemic to Madagascar, where is occurs in the northern part of the island through the eastern coast to the southern end of the island. It is almost exclusively found in mature closed forest with large trees but can also be found on slopes with numerous saplings, and is rare in disturbed forest.

Description

The short-legged ground roller has a large head and bill, a puffy throat. It is the largest forest ground roller, and is stouter than the other species (except for the scaly ground roller). It measures  in length and weighs . Where sexed individuals have been weighed the males were heavier, but the sample size was small. As the name suggests the legs are short for the family, but contrary to its generic name the wings are the longest in the family, making this the most arboreal species, but is still not a strong flier.

Like the other members of the family, the plumage is cryptic.

Behaviour
The short-legged ground roller is a secretive species that has been little studied. Everything that is known about the behaviour of the species has come from a single systematic study of a single pair in Masoala National Park and from incidental observations of other birds.

Status and conservation
The short-legged ground roller is considered to be fairly common in its natural habitat. Nevertheless it is considered to be threatened with extinction due to the rapid loss of its habitat to slash and burn for subsistence agriculture. Its habitat is also considered to be threatened by climate change. Modelling of habitat change due to climate change predicts that the species may lose up to 62% of its current habitat. The species is also hunted.

References

External links
BirdLife Species Factsheet.

short-legged ground roller
Endemic birds of Madagascar
short-legged ground roller
Taxonomy articles created by Polbot
Fauna of the Madagascar lowland forests